Nicolas Testé (born November 28, 1970) is a French concert, song and opera singer in the bass and baritone vocal range.

Career 
Born in Paris, Testé first studied piano, bassoon and music history in Paris. He studied singing at the Paris Opéra and the "Centre de Formation Lyrique", among others. In 1998, he won second place in the "Voix Nouvelles" singing competition. The artist sang and sings on the opera stages of Milan, Munich, Leipzig, Geneva, Lyon, Berlin, Antwerp, Vienna and New York. etc. His role repertoire includes: Léandro (The Love for Three Oranges), Ferrando (Il trovatore), Masetto (Don Giovanni), Angelotti (Tosca), Colline (La Bohème) and Agamemnon (Iphigénie en Aulide) among others. In 2014 he appeared together with his wife in Lotte de Beer's much discussed production of Les pêcheurs de perles in Theater an der Wien.

Testé is also active as a song and concert singer. In this respect he has worked with conductors such as John Eliot Gardiner, Emmanuel Krivine, Charles Mackerras, Heiko Mathias Förster and Pinchas Steinberg.

The singer has been married to the soprano Diana Damrau since May 2010; the couple has two sons.

References

External links 

 Official website
 Nicolas Teslé's performances (Metropolitan Opera Association)
 Discography (Discogs)
 Nicolas Testé (Bach Cantatas Website)
 Diana Damrau & Nicolas Testé - Somewhere (YouTube)

1970 births
Living people
Singers from Paris
French operatic baritones
21st-century French singers
21st-century French male singers